is a former Japanese football player.

Playing career
Kawamura was born in Numazu on June 24, 1980. After graduating from high school, he joined J1 League club Vissel Kobe. On April 12, 2000, he debuted in J.League Cup (v Omiya Ardija). In 2002, he moved to Japan Football League (JFL) club Jatco. However the club was disbanded end of 2003 season. He moved to Prefectural Leagues club FC Eastern in 2004, and to Prefectural Leagues club Numazu Koryo Club (later Azul Claro Numazu) in 2005. The club was promoted to Regional Leagues in 2012 and JFL in 2014. In 2014, he was retired.

Club statistics

References

External links

1980 births
Living people
Association football people from Shizuoka Prefecture
Japanese footballers
J1 League players
Japan Football League players
Vissel Kobe players
Jatco SC players
Azul Claro Numazu players
Association football forwards